Eddie Donovan (June 2, 1922 in Elizabeth, New Jersey – January 20, 2001) was a professional basketball coach and executive.

He coached the New York Knickerbockers from 1961 through 1965, and was the coach on the opposing sideline when Philadelphia Warriors center Wilt Chamberlain had his record-setting 100-point game in Hershey, Pennsylvania on March 2, 1962.

He later became the team's general manager. In that role, he drafted Willis Reed and traded for Dave DeBusschere, two moves leading up to the Knicks winning the NBA title in 1970.

Donovan later became an executive with the Buffalo Braves, where he won the NBA Executive of the Year Award for the 1973–74 season.

Prior to his career with the Knicks, Donovan was the head men's basketball coach at St. Bonaventure University from 1953 through 1961.

Death 
Eddie Donovan died on January 20, 2001, when he was 78. The cause for his death was said to be the complications of stroke.

References

External links
 BasketballReference.com: Eddie Donovan

1922 births
2001 deaths
American men's basketball coaches
Basketball coaches from New Jersey
Buffalo Braves personnel
College men's basketball head coaches in the United States
Los Angeles Clippers executives
National Basketball Association general managers
New York Knicks head coaches
Sportspeople from Elizabeth, New Jersey
St. Bonaventure Bonnies men's basketball coaches
St. Bonaventure Bonnies men's basketball players